Children's Cancer and Blood Foundation (CCBF) is a registered charity in the United States. Founded in 1952, CCBF is the first and largest charitable organization dedicated to supporting the care of children with cancer and blood diseases.

References

External links 

 Official website

Organizations established in 1952
Cancer charities in the United States
Children's charities based in the United States
Medical and health organizations based in New York (state)
1952 establishments in the United States